La Melodía de la Calle is Tony Dize's debut studio album, released on April 22, 2008 on WY Records and Machete Music. It was nominated for a Lo Nuestro Award for Urban Album of the Year.

Track listing

Chart performance

References 

2008 debut albums
WY Records albums
Machete Music albums